Hinokuma Shrine (日前神宮, Hinokuma jingu) and Kunikakasu Shrine (國懸神宮, Kunikakasu jingu) is a Shinto shrine complex in Wakayama, Wakayama Prefecture, Japan. Its main festival is held annually on September 26. It shares the rank of the Ise Grand Shrine in the shinkai system. It was formerly an imperial shrine of the first rank (官幣大社, kanpei taisha) in the modern system of ranked Shinto shrines. It was also formerly the ichinomiya of Kii Province.

Transportation
The shrine can be reached by Nichizengū Station on the Wakayama Electric Railway Kishigawa Line.

See also
List of Jingū

References

External links
Official website

Kanpei-taisha

Shinto shrines in Wakayama Prefecture